Lake Township is a township in Pocahontas County, Iowa, USA.

History
Lake Township was established in June 1877 as Burke Township. A few months later it was renamed to Lake from several small lakes located within its borders.

References

Townships in Pocahontas County, Iowa
Townships in Iowa